Rivarolo may refer to the following places in Italy:

Rivarolo Canavese, comune in the province of Turin
Rivarolo del Re ed Uniti, comune in the province of Cremona
Rivarolo Mantovano, comune in the province of Mantua
Rivarolo or Rivarolo Ligure, an autonomous commune until 1926, now  a quarter of Genoa